Simeon Brewster Chase (April 18, 1828 – January 9, 1909) was an American politician who served as the Speaker pro tempore of the Pennsylvania House of Representatives and was active in the Prohibition Party.

Life

Simeon Brewster Chase was born on April 18, 1828, to Amasa Chase and Sarah Guile in Gibson, Pennsylvania. In 1851, he graduated from Hamilton College with a law degree and later married Fanny DuBois. In 1851, he and Ezra Chase, who later served as the Speaker of the Pennsylvania House of Representatives, purchase the Montrose Democrat and served as an editor for the paper until he left the Democratic Party in 1856 to join the Republican. 

In 1856, he served as the chairman of the Susquehanna County Republican Convention and later served in the state House of Representatives from 1857 to 1861. In 1869, he served as one of the founding members of the Prohibition Party and served as the president of the party's first national convention in 1872. 

In 1872, he received the Prohibition gubernatorial nomination, ran for Pennsylvania Supreme Court in 1878, and ran for the House of Representatives in 1878, 1886, 1888, and 1892.

Chase died on January 9, 1909.

Electoral history

References

External links

1851 births
1925 deaths
19th-century American politicians
American temperance activists
Members of the Pennsylvania House of Representatives
Pennsylvania Democrats
Pennsylvania Prohibitionists
Pennsylvania Republicans